Tongan (English pronunciation:  or) is an Austronesian language of the Polynesian branch native to the island nation of Tonga. It has around 187,000 speakers. It uses the word order verb–subject–object.

Related languages
Tongan is one of the multiple languages in the Polynesian branch of the Austronesian languages, along with Hawaiian, Māori, Samoan and Tahitian, for example. Together with Niuean, it forms the Tongic subgroup of Polynesian.

Tongan is unusual among Polynesian languages in that it has a so-called definitive accent. As with all Polynesian languages, Tongan has adapted the phonological system of proto-Polynesian.

(The  found in modern Tongan derives from *t before high front vowels). Most Polynesian languages have lost the original proto-Polynesian glottal stop ; however, it has been retained in Tongan and a few other languages including Rapa Nui.
 In proto-Polynesian, *r and *l were distinct phonemes, but in most Polynesian languages they have merged, represented orthographically as r in most East Polynesian languages, and as l in most West Polynesian languages. However, the distinction can be reconstructed because Tongan kept the *l but lost the *r.

Tongan has heavily influenced the Wallisian language after Tongans colonized the island of ʻUvea in the 15th and 16th centuries.

Writing

History
The earliest attempts to transcribe the Tongan language were made by Willem Schouten and Jacob Le Maire of the Dutch East India Company when they first arrived in 1616. They transcribed a limited number of nouns and verbs using phonetic Dutch spelling and added them to a growing list of Polynesian vocabulary. Abel Tasman, also of the Dutch East India Company, attempted to converse with indigenous Tongans using vocabulary from this list when he arrived on Tongatapu on 20 January 1643, although he was poorly understood, likely using words added from different Polynesian languages.

Alphabet 
Tongan is presently written in a subset of the Latin script. In the old, "missionary" alphabet, the order of the letters was modified: the vowels were put first and then followed by the consonants: a, e, i, o, u, etc. That was still so as of the Privy Council decision of 1943 on the orthography of the Tongan language. However, C. M. Churchward's grammar and dictionary favoured the standard European alphabetical order, which, since his time, has been in use exclusively:

Notes:
 unaspirated; written as b before 1943
 sometimes written as j before 1943 (see below)
 the glottal stop. It should be written with the modifier letter turned comma (Unicode 0x02BB) and not with the single quote open or with a mixture of quotes open and quotes close. See also okina.

Note that the above order is strictly followed in proper dictionaries. Therefore, ngatu follows nusi, a follows vunga and it also follows z if foreign words occur. Words with long vowels come directly after those with short vowels. Improper wordlists may or may not follow these rules. (For example, the Tonga telephone directory for years now ignores all rules.)

By 1943, j was no longer used. Consequently, many words written with s in Tongan are cognate to those with t in other Polynesian languages. For example, Masisi (a star name) in Tongan is cognate with Matiti in Tokelauan; siale (Gardenia taitensis) in Tongan and tiare in Tahitian.

Phonology

Consonants

/l/ may also be heard as an alveolar flap sound .

Vowels

Syllabification 

Each syllable has exactly one vowel. The number of syllables in a word is exactly equal to the number of vowels it has.
Long vowels, indicated with a toloi (macron), count as one, but may in some circumstances be split up in two short ones, in which case, they are both written. Toloi are supposed to be written where needed, in practice this may be seldom done.
Each syllable may have no more than one consonant.
Consonant combinations are not permitted. The ng is not a consonant combination, since it represents a single sound.
Each syllable must end in a vowel. All vowels are pronounced, but an i at the end of an utterance is usually unvoiced.
The fakaua is a consonant. It must be followed (and, except at the beginning of a word, preceded) by a vowel. Unlike the glottal stops in many other Polynesian languages texts, the fakaua is always written. (Only sometimes before 1943.)
Stress normally falls on the next-to-last syllable of a word with two or more syllables; example:  (sleep),  (bed). If, however, the last vowel is long, it takes the stress; example:  (mouse) (stress on the long ā). The stress also shifts to the last vowel if the next word is an enclitic; example:  (house),  (this house). Finally the stress can shift to the last syllable, including an enclitic, in case of the definitive accent; example:  ((that) particular bed),  (this particular house). It is also here that a long vowel can be split into two short ones; example: pō (night), poó ni (this night), pō ní (this particular night). Or the opposite:  (light),  (this light),  (this particular light). There are some exceptions to the above general rules. The stress accent is normally not written, except where it is to indicate the definitive accent or fakamamafa. But here, too, people often neglect to write it, only using it when the proper stress cannot be easily derived from the context.

Although the acute accent has been available on most personal computers from their early days onwards, when Tongan newspapers started to use computers around 1990 to produce their papers, they were unable to find, or failed to enter, the proper keystrokes, and it grew into a habit to put the accent after the vowel instead of on it: not  but . But as this distance seemed to be too big, a demand arose for Tongan fonts where the acute accent was shifted to the right, a position halfway in between the two extremes above. Most papers still follow this practice.

Grammar

Articles
English, like most European languages, uses only two articles:
indefinite a
definite the

By contrast, Tongan has three articles, and possessives also have a three-level definiteness distinction:
 indefinite, nonspecific: ha. Example: ko ha fale ('a house', 'any house' - the speaker has no specific house in mind, any house will satisfy this description, e.g. 'I want to buy a house')
 indefinite, specific: (h)e. Example: ko e fale ('a (particular) particular house' - the speaker has a specific house in mind, but the listener is not expected to know which house, e.g. 'I bought a house')
 definite, specific: (h)e with the shifted ultimate stress. Example: ko e falé ('the house', - the speaker has a specific house in mind and the listener is expected to know which one from context, e.g. 'I bought the house I told you about').

Registers
There are three registers which consist of
 ordinary words (the normal language)
 honorific words (the language for the chiefs)
 regal words (the language for the king)
There are also further distinctions between 
 polite words (used for more formal contexts)
 derogatory words (used for informal contexts, or to indicate humility)
For example, the phrase "Come and eat!" translates to:
 ordinary: hau o kai (come and eat!); Friends, family members and so forth may say this to each other when invited for dinner.
 honorific: mea mai pea ilo (come and eat!); The proper used towards chiefs, particularly the nobles, but it may also be used by an employee towards his boss, or in other similar situations. When talking about chiefs, however, it is always used, even if they are not actually present, but in other situations only on formal occasions. A complication to the beginning student of Tongan is that such words very often also have an alternative meaning in the ordinary register: mea (thing) and ilo (know, find).
 regal: hāele mai pea taumafa (come and eat!); Used towards the king or God. The same considerations as for the honorific register apply. Hāele is one of the regal words which have become the normal word in other Polynesian languages.

Pronouns
The Tongan language distinguishes three numbers: singular, dual, and plural. They appear as the three major columns in the tables below.

The Tongan language distinguishes four persons: First person exclusive, first person inclusive, second person and third person. They appear as the four major rows in the tables below.  This gives us 12 main groups.

Subjective and objective

In addition, possessive pronouns are either alienable (reddish) or inalienable (greenish), which Churchward termed subjective and objective. This marks a distinction that has been referred to, in some analyses of other Polynesian languages, as a-possession versus o-possession, respectively, though more Tongan-appropriate version would be e-possession and ho-possession.

Subjective and objective are fitting labels when dealing with verbs: eku taki "my leading" vs. hoku taki "my being led".  However, this is less apt when used on nouns.  Indeed, in most contexts hoku taki would be interpreted as "my leader", as a noun rather than a verb.  What then of nouns that have no real verb interpretation, such as fale "house"?

Churchward himself laid out the distinction thus:

But what about those innumerable cases in which the possessive can hardly be said to correspond either to the subject or to the object of a verb?  What, for example, is the rule or the guiding principle, which lies behind the fact that a Tongan says eku paanga for ' my money' but hoku fale for 'my house'?

It may be stated as follows: the use of eku for 'my' implies that I am active, influential, or formative, &c., towards the thing mentioned, whereas the use of hoku for 'my' implies that the thing mentioned is active, influential, or formative, &c., towards me.  Or, provided that we give a sufficiently wide meaning to the word 'impress', we may say, perhaps, that eku is used in reference to things upon which I impress myself, while hoku is used in reference to things which impress themselves upon me.

E possessives are generally used for:

Goods, money, tools, utensils, instruments, weapons, vehicles, and other possessions which the subject owns or uses (eku paanga, "my money")
Animals or birds which the subjects owns or uses (eku fanga puaka, "my pigs")
Things which the subject eats, drinks, or smokes (eku meakai, "my food")
Things which the subject originates, makes, mends, carries, or otherwise deals with (eku kavenga, "my burden")
Persons in the subject's employ, under their control, or in their care (eku tamaioeiki "my male servant")

Ho possessives are generally used for

Things which are a part of the subject or 'unalienable' from the subject, such as body parts (hoku sino, "my body")
Persons or things which represent the subject (hoku hingoa, "my name")
The subject's relatives, friends, associates, or enemies (hoku hoa, "my companion (spouse)")
Things which are provided for the subject or devolve to them or fall to their lot (hoku tofia, "my inheritance")
In general, persons or things which surround, support, or control the subject, or on which the subject depends (hoku kolo, "my village/town")

There are plenty of exceptions which do not fall under the guidelines above, for instance, eku tamai, "my father".  The number of exceptions is large enough to make the alienable and inalienable distinction appear on the surface to be as arbitrary as the grammatical gender distinction for Romance languages, but by and large the above guidelines hold true.

Cardinal pronouns
The cardinal pronouns are the main personal pronouns which in Tongan can either be preposed (before the verb, light colour) or postposed (after the verb, dark colour). The first are the normal alienable possessive pronouns, the latter the stressed alienable pronouns, which are sometimes used as reflexive pronouns, or with kia te in front the inalienable possessive forms. (There is no possession involved in the cardinal pronouns and therefore no alienable or inalienable forms).

all the preposed pronouns of one syllable only (ku, u, ma, te, ta, ke, mo, ne, na) are enclitics which never can take the stress, but put it on the vowel in front of them. Example: ʻoku naú versus ʻokú na (not: ʻoku ná).
first person singular, I uses u after kuo, te, ne, and also ka (becomes kau), pea, mo and ʻo; but uses ou after ʻoku; and uses ku after naʻa.
first person inclusive (I and you) is somewhat of a misnomer, at least in the singular. The meanings of te and kita can often rendered as one, that is the modesty I.
Examples of use.
Naʻa ku fehuʻi: I asked
Naʻe fehuʻi (ʻe) au: I(!) asked (stressed)
ʻOku ou fehuʻi au: I ask myself
Te u fehuʻi kiate koe: I shall ask you
Te ke tali kiate au: You will answer me
Kapau te te fehuʻi: If one would ask
Tau ō ki he hulohula?: Are we (all) going to the ball?
Sinitalela, mau ō ki he hulohula: Cinderella, we go to the ball (... said the evil stepmother, and she went with two of her daughters, but not Cinderella)

Another archaic aspect of Tongan is the retention of preposed pronouns. They are used much less frequently in Sāmoan and have completely disappeared in East Polynesian languages, where the pronouns are cognate with the Tongan postposed form minus ki-. (We love you: ʻOku ʻofa kimautolu kia te kimoutolu; Māori: e aroha nei mātou i a koutou).

Possessive pronouns
The possessives for every person and number (1st person plural, 3rd person dual, etc.) can be further divided into normal or ordinary (light colour), emotional (medium colour) and emphatic (bright colour) forms. The latter is rarely used, but the two former are common and further subdivided in definite (saturated colour) and indefinite (greyish colour) forms.

Notes:
the ordinary definite possessives starting with he (in italics) drop this prefix after any word except ʻi, ki, mei, ʻe. Example: ko ʻeku tohi, my book; ʻi heʻeku tohi, in my book.
all ordinary alienable possessive forms contain a fakauʻa, the inalienable forms do not.
the emphatic forms are not often used, but if they are, they take the definitive accent from the following words (see below)
first person inclusive (me and you) is somewhat of a misnomer. The meanings of heʻete, hoto, etc. can often rendered as one's, that is the modesty me.
the choice between an alienable or inalienable possessive is determined by the word or phrase it refers to. For example: ko ho fale '(it is) your house' (inalienable), ko ho'o tohi, '(it is) your book' (alienable). *Ko ho tohi, ko hoʻo fale* are wrong. Some words can take either, but with a difference in meaning: ko ʻene taki 'his/her leadership'; ko hono taki 'his/her leader'.

Examples of use.
ko haʻaku/haku kahoa: my garland (any garland from or for me)
ko ʻeku/hoku kahoa: my garland (it is my garland)
ko ʻeku/hoku kahoá: my garland, that particular one and no other
ko heʻete/hoto kahoa: one's garland {mine in fact, but that is not important}
ko siʻaku kahoa: my cherished garland (any cherished garland from or for me)
ko siʻeku/siʻoku kahoa: my cherished garland (it is my cherished garland)
ko haʻakú/hoʻokú kahoa: garland (emphatically mine) – that particular garland is mine and not someone else's
ko homa kahoa: our garlands (exclusive: you and I are wearing them, but not the person we are talking to)
ko hota kahoa: our garlands (inclusive: you and I are wearing them, and I am talking to you)

Other pronouns
These are the remainders: the pronominal adjectives (mine), indirect object pronouns or pronominal adverbs (for me) and the adverbial possessives (as me).

Notes:
the first syllable in all singular pronominal adjectives (in italics) is reduplicated and can be dropped for somewhat less emphasis
the pronominal adjectives put a stronger emphasis on the possessor than the possessive pronouns do
the use of the adverbial possessives is rare
Examples of use:
ko hono valá: it is his/her/its clothing/dress
ko e vala ʻona: it is his/her/its (!) clothing/dress
ko e vala ʻoʻona: it is his/her/its (!!!) clothing/dress
ko hono valá ʻona: it is his/her/its own clothing/dress
ko hono vala ʻoná: it is his/her/its own clothing/dress; same as previous
ko hono vala ʻoʻoná: it is his/her/its very own clothing/dress
ʻoku ʻoʻona ʻa e valá ni: this clothing is his/hers/its
ʻoku moʻona ʻa e valá: the clothing is for him/her/it
ʻoange ia moʻono valá: give it (to him/her/it) as his/hers/its clothing

Numerals

In Tongan, "telephone-style" numerals can be used: reading numbers by simply saying their digits one by one. For 'simple' two-digit multiples of ten both the 'full-style' and 'telephone-style' numbers are in equally common use, while for other two-digit numbers the 'telephone-style' numbers are almost exclusively in use:

ʻOku fiha ia? (how much (does it cost)?) Paʻanga ʻe ua-nima-noa (T$2.50)

In addition there are special, traditional counting systems for fish, coconuts, yams, etc.

Literature

One of the first publications of Tongan texts was in William Mariner's grammar and dictionary of the Tongan language, edited and published in 1817 by John Martin as part of volume 2 of Mariner's Account of the Natives of the Tonga Islands, in the South Pacific Ocean.  Orthography has changed since Mariner's time.

An annotated list of dictionaries and vocabularies of the Tongan language is available at the website of the Bibliographical Society of America under the resource heading 'Breon Mitchell": https://bibsocamer.org/bibsite-home/list-of-resources/.

Tongan is primarily a spoken, rather than written, language. The Bible and the Book of Mormon were translated into Tongan and few other books were written in it.

There are several weekly and monthly magazines in Tongan, but there are no daily newspapers.

Weekly newspapers, some of them twice per week:
Ko e Kalonikali ʻo Tonga
Ko e Keleʻa
Taimi ʻo Tonga
Talaki
Ko e Tauʻatāina
Tonga Maʻa Tonga

Monthly or two-monthly papers, mostly church publications:
Taumuʻa lelei (Catholic Church)
Tohi fanongonongo (Free Wesleyan)
Liahona (The Church of Jesus Christ of Latter-day Saints)
ʻOfa ki Tonga (Tokaikolo)

Calendar
The Tongan calendar was based on the phases of the moon and had 13 months. The main purpose of the calendar, for Tongans, was to determine the time for the planting and cultivation of yams, which were Tonga's most important staple food.

Notes

Further reading

References
C.Maxwell Churchward, Tongan Grammar. 1999. Tonga: Vavaʼu Press  (previously: 1953. London: Oxford University Press ; 1985. Tonga: Vavaʼu Press )
C.Maxwell Churchward, Tongan Dictionary: Tongan-English and English-Tongan. 1999. Tonga: Vavaʼu Press (previously: 1959. London : Oxford University Press)
Edgar Tuʻinukuafe, A Simplified Dictionary of Modern Tongan. 1993. Polynesian Press , 
Harry Feldman, Some Notes on Tongan Phonology. 1978. Oceanic Linguistics 17. 133–139.

External links

Planet Tonga
Omniglot on Tongan
Basic online Tongan–English and English–Tongan dictionary

Languages of Tonga
Tongic languages
Polynesian languages
Verb–subject–object languages